V80 may refer to :
 V80-1.8MW and V80-2.0MW, two Vestas wind turbine models
 the serial number of a 1995 Ariane 4 launch that put the Infrared Space Observatory into orbit
NEC V80, an improved version of the NEC V70 CPU

V 80 may refer to :
 DB Class V 80, a 1952 type of German diesel locomotive operated by the Deutsche Bundesbahn
 SMS V 80, a V 67 Class German Imperial Navy torpedo boat

V-80 may refer to :
 Kamov V-80, a design study designation for a 1975 Russian attack helicopter
 German submarine V-80, a 1939 German Navy 80 ton experimental submarine with a hydrogen peroxide-based turbine

V.80 may refer to :
 V.80, an ITU-T V-Series Recommendation for videoconferencing